Tarkint  is a village and commune in the Cercle of Bourem in the Gao Region of north-eastern Mali. Tarkint extends for 23,000 km2 and includes part of the Tilemsi Valley. In the 2009 census Tarkint had a population of 19,082.

Cocaine Air 
The sandblown village became notorious in 2009, when the burnt-out wreckage of an old Boeing 727 airliner was found abandoned in the desert, 85 miles north of Gao, at the scene of the so-called "Cocaine Air" incident. It is believed that the aircraft had been transporting up to 10 tons of cocaine.

References

Communes of Gao Region
Communities on the Niger River